Kamiz castle is a historical castle located in Rudan County in Hormozgan Province, The longevity of this fortress dates back to the middle of post-Islamic historical periods.

References 

Castles in Iran